Interstate 80 (I-80) is a part of the Interstate Highway System that runs from San Francisco, California, to Teaneck, New Jersey. From west to east, I-80 crosses the state line from Nevada in Tooele County and traverses the Bonneville Salt Flats—which are a part of the larger Great Salt Lake Desert. It continues alongside the Wendover Cut-off—the corridor of the former Victory Highway—US Route 40 (US-40) and the Western Pacific Railroad Feather River Route. After passing the Oquirrh Mountains, I-80 enters the Salt Lake Valley and Salt Lake County. A short portion of the freeway is concurrent with I-15 through Downtown Salt Lake City. At the Spaghetti Bowl, I-80 turns east again into the mouth of Parleys Canyon and Summit County, travels through the mountain range, and intersects the eastern end of I-84 near Echo Reservoir before turning northeast toward the Wyoming border near Evanston. I-80 was built along the corridor of the Lincoln Highway and the Mormon Trail through the Wasatch Range. The easternmost section also follows the historical routes of the first transcontinental railroad and US-30S.

Construction of the controlled-access highway began in the 1950s, and, by the late 1970s, most of the freeway across the state of Utah had been completed. The  section of I-80 between State Route 68 (SR-68, Redwood Road) and Salt Lake City International Airport was the last piece of the nearly  freeway to be completed. Average daily traffic volumes in 2012 ranged between 6,765 vehicles using the freeway at SR-58 and 121,205 vehicles using the freeway at the Spaghetti Bowl in Downtown Salt Lake City. Throughout the state, the highway is also known as the Purple Heart Trail.

Route description
Out of the 11 states which I-80 passes through, the  segment in Utah is the fourth shortest. As part of the Interstate Highway System, the entire route is listed on the National Highway System, a system of roads that are important to the nation's economy, defense, and mobility.

Every year, the Utah Department of Transportation (UDOT) conducts a series of surveys on its highways to measure traffic volumes. This measure is expressed in terms of annual average daily traffic (AADT), a measure of traffic volume for any average day of the year. In 2012, UDOT calculated that as few as 6,765 vehicles traveled I-80 at the interchange with SR-58 in Wendover, and as many as 121,205 vehicles used the highway at the Spaghetti Bowl in Downtown Salt Lake City. Between 7 and 58 percent of the traffic recorded consisted of trucks. These counts are for the portion of the freeway in Utah.

Tooele County
The freeway enters Utah from Nevada in the city of Wendover on the edge of the Bonneville Salt Flats. The cities of West Wendover, Nevada, and Wendover are accessible by I-80's only business loop in Utah, whose interchange is just south of Danger Cave. The highway closely follows the historical routes of the Wendover Cut-off, Victory Highway, and formerly Western Pacific Railroad's Feather River Route (now part of the Union Pacific Railroad Central Corridor) across the salt flats and the larger Great Salt Lake Desert. Bonneville Speedway, home to many land speed records, is accessible from I-80.

Bounded on each sides by military training grounds, the I-80 corridor is overflown by commercial airliners traveling west from Salt Lake City International Airport. The freeway veers north around the Cedar Mountains in a small gap between them and the Lakeside Mountains. Further east, the highway passes the Stansbury Mountains, which are located in the Wasatch–Cache National Forest. After the mountain ranges, the freeway arrives at the southern shore of the Great Salt Lake and closely follows the shore toward the western suburbs of Salt Lake City. However, the historical routes from which the route of I-80 was derived were routed further from the lake, passing through the towns of Grantsville and Tooele; these communities are now served by SR-138 and SR-36, respectively. After an interchange with SR-36 at Lake Point, the highway crosses a bottleneck between the Oquirrh Mountains and the Great Salt Lake.

Salt Lake County

While traversing the neck, views can be had from I-80 of the lake and Antelope Island. After passing the neck, the road forks, with I-80 proceeding toward the north end of Salt Lake City and SR-201 proceeding toward the south end. Historically, this intersection was the separation of US-40 and US-50. After the intersection, the freeway corridor is again bottlenecked with the Great Salt Lake to the north and the Kennecott Utah Copper smelter and tailings pond to the south. The Kennecott Utah Copper's Bingham Canyon Mine, which was once considered to be the largest open-pit copper mine, can be seen in the distance. The  Kennecott Garfield Smelter Stack is one of the tallest freestanding structures in the United States. Along this portion, the freeway passes the historical site of Saltair.

The freeway enters the Salt Lake Valley on the former alignment of North Temple Street until it passes Salt Lake City International Airport, where the freeway veers slightly south and leaves the North Temple Street corridor which leads to Temple Square in Downtown Salt Lake City. The Green Line of the Utah Transit Authority (UTA) TRAX system briefly parallels I-80 before traveling down the center of North Temple Street. The southern interchange with I-15, which also includes SR-201 (21st South Freeway) and marks the end of the concurrency, is known as the Spaghetti Bowl. In the southwestern corner of the Spaghetti Bowl is another portion of the UTA TRAX Green Line as it travels towards West Valley City. After separating from I-15, the freeway continues easterly through South Salt Lake, loosely following an alignment just south of 2100 South and the UTA S Line streetcar through the Sugar House neighborhood and past Sugar House Park—once the home of the Sugar House Prison—toward the clockwise terminus of the I-215 270-degree beltway around Salt Lake City. It continues through Parleys Canyon, where the freeway joins the historical route of the Lincoln Highway. Between the mouth of the canyon and the Summit County line, the route reenters the Wasatch National Forest.

Summit County
Both the canyon and summit were named for Parley P. Pratt, an early settler to the Salt Lake Valley and an early Mormon leader who was asked to survey a new route across the mountains to replace the route through Emigration Canyon. Between 1848 and 1851, Pratt surveyed, completed, and operated the Golden Pass toll road through the canyon that today bears his name. Pratt had unsuccessfully solicited for $800 (equivalent to $ in ) to build the road and sold it for $1,500 (equivalent to $ in ). On- and offramps for the Wyoming port-of-entry are located just within Utah. In January 2014, UDOT introduced variable speed limits to I-80 in Parleys Canyon, allowing a speed limit between  up to the normal  depending on weather or traffic conditions.

Beyond Parleys Summit lies Park City, a mining town today better known for its many ski resorts. The Historic Union Pacific Rail Trail State Park travels in the median between carriageways of I-80 before paralleling the highway until the southern end of Echo Reservoir. The freeway turns north upon reaching the Rockport Reservoir at Wanship following the tributaries of the Weber River toward Echo Reservoir and Dam. Upon reaching Echo Canyon and the junction with the eastern terminus of the western section of I-84, the freeway follows the canyon east until it reaches the Wyoming state line near Evanston. I-80 forms the northeastern border between Rich and Summit counties.

The portion through Echo Canyon follows the historical routes of the Mormon Trail, US-30S, and the first transcontinental railroad. A rest area in the canyon just east of the junction with I-84 features signs pointing out features that were obstacles for both the Mormon pioneers and the railroad construction workers, including Pulpit Rock, which was partially demolished when the I-80 was built through the canyon.

History

Earlier roads

I-80 follows the routes of two major auto trails through the state. In western Utah, I-80 follows the historical route of the Victory Highway from Wendover at the Nevada state line to the junction of US-40 near Park City. Throughout Utah, I-80 is signed as the modern route of the Lincoln Highway—except through Salt Lake City, where the Lincoln Highway is routed along SR-201 and Parley's Way. The route of the Lincoln Highway across Utah was generally derived from the route of the Pony Express and Central Overland Route. However, much of the original route of the Lincoln Highway west of Salt Lake City is inaccessible. The original route of the Lincoln Highway proceeded southwest from Tooele toward Ely, Nevada. This area is now used for military bases, such as the Dugway Proving Ground and Tooele Army Depot. The area was closed to the public when these bases were established. I-80 and US-93 are the modern signing of the Lincoln Highway between those two cities. East of Salt Lake City, I-80 closely parallels the original route of the Lincoln Highway.

In 1926, much of the route covered by I-80, including Pratt's former toll road from the Nevada state line into Salt Lake City, was signed as US-40 then as US-30 to the Wyoming state line. It was also part of the Victory Highway west of Salt Lake and the Lincoln Highway east of Salt Lake at this time. Most of the route had been improved but some stretches of graded road remained. In 1937, parts of the route near Wanship were numbered US-530. In 1950, the highway near Echo was designated US-30S and US-189. By 1959, US-50 Alternate (US-50 Alt) was also routed along the western portion of I-80.

Current road
The first Utah state route to have the number 80 is now known as SR-92, which was originally numbered SR-80 until the 1977 Utah state route renumbering. Previously, the freeway's legislative designation was SR-2.

Passage of the Federal-Aid Highway Act of 1956 formed the Interstate Highway System, and the I-80 number was first designated to a then-unconstructed controlled-access highway across the state by 1957. I-80 was constructed in segments, starting in the late 1950s. By the late 1970s, the Utah portion of I-80—except for a gap on the western edge of Salt Lake City—was largely complete. A  section between Redwood Road and Salt Lake City International Airport is the final link of the transcontinental freeway to be completed. As an Interstate Highway, design specifications require a controlled-access highway with no at-grade intersections. This section was dedicated on August 22, 1986, and was the last to be completed to Interstate Highway specifications along the almost  route of I-80 between San Francisco, California, and Teaneck, New Jersey. The section was completed close to the 30th anniversary of the Interstate Highway System, which was noted at the dedication and considered to be a milestone in the history of highway construction in the United States.

The original designation of I-84, which begins at an interchange with I-80 in Echo, was I-80N. This designation was changed to I-84 in 1977 by the American Association of State Highway and Transportation Officials (AASHTO) despite objections from the Washington State Department of Transportation (WSDOT) and the Idaho Transportation Department (ITD) and with the support of UDOT and the Oregon Department of Transportation (ODOT). The legislative designation for this highway was SR-3 until the 1977 renumbering.

Rebuilding of the first portions of I-80 began in October 1990 with a  stretch near Redwood Road in Salt Lake City. By 1991, UDOT estimated that the reconstruction of all federally funded highways in the state would cost up to $4.3 billion (equivalent to $ in ). The Spaghetti Bowl interchange was first proposed in 1996 to accommodate traffic for the 2002 Winter Olympics being held in the city. Most of the Spaghetti Bowl was open by November 2000; the remainder opened in early 2001. In 2002, the Utah State Legislature named the highway the Purple Heart trail, in honor of wounded war veterans. Additional reconstruction work—which involved the replacement of most of the bridges along the route and the resurfacing and installation of sound barriers—was done on I-80 between the Spaghetti Bowl and Parleys Canyon in 2007 and 2008.

Exit list

See also
Interstate 80 Business (West Wendover, Nevada–Wendover, Utah)

Notes

References

External links

Interstate 80 in Utah on AARoads

80
 Utah
Transportation in Tooele County, Utah
Transportation in Salt Lake County, Utah
Transportation in Summit County, Utah
Interstate 080 in Utah
Central Overland Route
U.S. Route 40